Hans Vilhelm Aabech (1 November 1948 – 8 January 2018) was a Danish football player. He played for a number of clubs, including Hvidovre IF, Kjøbenhavns Boldklub and Lyngby Boldklub in Denmark, Club Brugge and K.V. Oostende in Belgium, and Dutch clubs Twente Enschede and De Graafschap. He played three games for the Denmark national football team. He was twice top scorer in the Danish 1. Division, in 1973 and 1980. He is the father of footballer Kim Aabech.

References

External links 
 Hans Aabech on NationalFootballTeams.com
 Hans Aabech on DBU

1948 births
2018 deaths
Footballers from Copenhagen
Danish men's footballers
Danish expatriate men's footballers
Denmark international footballers
Kjøbenhavns Boldklub players
Hvidovre IF players
FC Twente players
De Graafschap players
Club Brugge KV players
K.S.C. Lokeren Oost-Vlaanderen players
K.V. Oostende players
Lyngby Boldklub players
Eredivisie players
Belgian Pro League players
Challenger Pro League players
Danish expatriate sportspeople in Belgium
Danish expatriate sportspeople in the Netherlands
Expatriate footballers in Belgium
Expatriate footballers in the Netherlands
Association football forwards
Skovshoved IF players